Lauri Porra (born 13 December 1977) is a Finnish bass guitarist and a composer who has written scores for films and other media, as well as commissions from orchestras such as the Lahti Symphony and the Finnish Radio Symphony. He is also known for his work as the bass guitarist in Stratovarius. Porra is a fourth generation musician, and the great-grandson of famous Finnish composer Jean Sibelius.

Early life

Porra started to study music at age 6 when he started to play cello in a local music school. In 1993 he switched to bass guitar and continued his studies in the Helsinki Pop Jazz Conservatory (1994–2004). He has also taken lessons in piano, double bass, trumpet and male vocals. From 1997 to 1999 he was a member of the YL male choir, performing for instance with the London Symphony Orchestra.

Career

Porra has released five instrumental solo albums, including Entropia (a collaboration with Lahti Symphony Orchestra), released in January 2018 on BIS-records. He has also composed music for films and other media. His orchestral compositions have been performed by the Finnish Radio Orchestra, Trondheim Symphony Orchestra, the Lahti Symphony Orchestra and the New Bedford Symphony His live projects include Lauri Porra Flyover Ensemble, which plays the music from his albums, and the Bach Reimagined project, which performs music based on J.S. Bach's six cello suites arranged and recomposed for electric bass, cello and electronics. Porra has performed in over 50 countries, with performances ranging from The Proms and Wacken Open Air to Pori Jazz. As a session musician he has played on over 50 records with styles ranging from heavy metal to contemporary classical, electronic, hip hop and pop albums.

In 2016 Porra received the Nordisk Popularauktors NPU-award and was nominated for a HARPA Nordic film composer music award.

Porra is artistic director of the Vantaa Pops orchestra, Founder and artistic director of Unelmien Heinola festival  and was artistic advisor of the Helsinki Festival (2015-2019).

Personal life 
Porra is married to conductor Dalia Stasevska.

Discography

Solo albums
 Dust/With Flyover Ensemble (2019)
 Entropia/With Lahti Symphony (2018)
 Flyover (2015)
 All Children Have Superpowers (2008)
 Lauri Porra (2005)

Orchestral works
 Flyover Symphony for ensemble and orchestra (2019)
 Memento for electric bass and orchestra (2019)
 Aineen ja ajan messu for orchestra, ensemble and two soloists (2017)
 Domino suite for orchestra and soloist(s) (2017)
 Near & Distant for concert band (2017)
 Kohta for orchestra and vocals (2016)
 Entropia concerto for orchestra and electric bass (2015)

Stratovarius
2022 Live Under The Southern Cross- South America 2019
2022 Survive
2018 Enigma: Intermission 2
2016 Best Of
2015 Eternal
2014 Nemesis Days
2013 Nemesis
2012 Under Flaming Winter Skies (Live In Tampere - The Jörg Michael Farewell Tour)
2012 Under Flaming Winter Skies: Live in Tampere
2011 Elysium
2010 Polaris Live
2009 Polaris

Film scores
 Heavy Trip (2018)
 Lapland odyssey (2017)
 Look of a killer (2016)
 Nuotin vierestä (2016)
 Hijack gone south (2013)
 Ratking (2012)
 Walker (2012)
 Life for sale (2011)
 V2: Dead angel (2007)

TV-series
 Elämää suurempaa (2012)
 Tappajan näköinen mies (2011)
 Underworld trilogy (2011)
 Married to a lie (2008)

Selected discography
 KXP: IV (2019)
 JVG: Rata/Raitti (2019) 
 Mikko Hassinen: Elektro GT (2015)
 Sini Sabotage: 22 m2 (2013)
 Stig: Niks ja Naks (2012) 
 Stratovarius: Nemesis (2013)
 Crazy World: The return of the clown (2012) 
 Stig: Puumaa mä metsästän (2012)
 Emma Salokoski: Valoa pimeään (2012) 
 Tuomas Wäinölä: Human being (2012)
 Kalle Ahola: Pääkallolipuna alla (2011) 
 Asa: Asamasa (2011)
 Freeman 4 (2011)
 Uusi Fantasia: Heimo (2010)
 Apocalyptica: Seventh Symphony (2010)
 Emma Salokoski Ensemble: Veden Alla (2008)
 Manna: Sister (2007)
 Guitar Heroes (2007)
 Kotipelto: Serenity (2007)
 Edu Falaschi: Almah (2006)
 Jonna ́s Problem: S/t (2006)
 Raskaampaa Joulua (2006)
 Torpedo: Tietä ja vähän bensaa (2005)
 Warmen: Accept the fact (2005)
 Ben Granfelt: Live experience (2005)
 Crazy world: Crazy world (2005)
 Kriya: Kriya (2005)
 Raskasta Joulua (2004)
 Emma Salokoski Ensemble: Kaksi mannerta (2005)
 Juice Leskinen & Mikko Alatalo: Senaattori ja Boheemi (2004) 
 Peter Lerche: Peshawar diary (2004)
 Esa Kotilainen: Turpeisen Baari (2003)
 Emma Salokoski Trio: Puutarhassa (2003)
 Tunnelvision: Tomorrow (2002)
 Warmen: Beyond abilities (2001)
 Ben Granfelt: All I Want To Be (2001)
 Warmen: unknown Soldier (2000)
 Tunnelvision: While the world awaits (1999)

References

External links
Lauri Porra official website

1977 births
Living people
Finnish heavy metal bass guitarists
Stratovarius members
21st-century bass guitarists
Sinergy members
Almah (band) members
Warmen members
Sibelius family